Jørgen Peder Laurids Jørgensen (19 May 1888 in Kornerup – 15 December 1974), was a Danish politician and party leader. Member of Folketinget for the Social Liberal Party 1929–1960.  Farmer by profession. As Minister for Education Jørgensen passed major school reforms in 1937 and 1958. He was party leader for two decades, although Bertel Dahlgaard, political spokesperson, and later minister for Economy, was co-leader. Jørgensen's mind and living was strongly influenced by the ideas of N. F. S. Grundtvig. 

Two of Jørgen Jørgensen's sons, Eigil and Erling, achieved leading positions in the Danish Central Administration. A third son, Svend, took over the farm and became a mayor of his regional council twice.

1888 births
1974 deaths
People from Lejre Municipality
Danish Social Liberal Party politicians
Education ministers of Denmark
Danish Interior Ministers
Members of the Folketing
Leaders of the Danish Social Liberal Party